Nikolay Jeliazkov or Zheliazkov (born ) is a former Bulgarian male volleyball player and coach. He was part of the Bulgaria men's national volleyball team at the 1994 FIVB Volleyball Men's World Championship and 1996 Summer Olympics. After his retirement he became a volleyball coach. He was coach of Bulgaria men's national volleyball team at the 2015 European Games in Baku, Azerbaijan.

Clubs

 CSKA Sofia
 Olympikus/Telesp
 Olympiacos Piraeus

References

1970 births
Living people
Bulgarian men's volleyball players
Bulgarian volleyball coaches
Olympiacos S.C. players
Place of birth missing (living people)
Olympic volleyball players of Bulgaria
Volleyball players at the 1996 Summer Olympics
PAOK V.C. players
Bulgarian expatriate sportspeople in Romania
20th-century Bulgarian people
21st-century Bulgarian people